The Auditor General of British Columbia is an independent Officer of the Legislature of British Columbia, responsible for conducting audits of the government reporting entity (GRE) which consists of ministries, Crown corporations, and other government organizations such as universities, colleges, school districts, health authorities, and similar organizations that are controlled by or accountable to the provincial government. Independence is a vital safeguard for fulfilling the Auditor General's responsibilities objectively and fairly based solely on the evidence found while conducting proper audit procedures. For this reason, the Auditor General reports directly to the Legislative Assembly and not the government of the day.

The Office of the Auditor General of British Columbia (OAGBC) is located in Victoria, B.C., Canada.

History

Auditors General in B.C.
The position of Auditor General in B.C. was first filled in 1861, with a continuous line of auditors general until 1917. However, these auditors did not benefit from objectivity and independence from government direction and operational priorities: qualities that are the distinguishing features of a modern auditing and legislative reporting function.

The position was re-established in 1977 with the Auditor General Act, brought in by the government of the day to "fill a gap that has existed in British Columbia up to this time," according to then-Finance Minister E.M. Wolfe.

Since then, the Auditor General has been governed solely by the Auditor General Act. Per the Act, the Legislative Assembly must unanimously appoint a person to be the Auditor General. The Auditor General holds office for a non-renewable eight-year term.

The Auditor General can resign from the office at any time by giving written notice to the Speaker of the Legislative Assembly. The Auditor General can be suspended from office if a resolution is passed by 2/3 or more of the members present in the Legislative Assembly.

List of all B.C. Auditors General

^Acting Auditor General
^^Audit Clerk

Present day

Current Auditor General
The current Auditor General of British Columbia is Michael Pickup. Mr. Pickup was appointed as the Auditor General of British Columbia in July 2020. Prior to his appointment, Mr. Pickup was the Auditor General of Nova Scotia from 2014 to 2020.

Office of the Auditor General

Quick Facts
Fiscal 2013/14:
Budgeted Costs:  $16.07M
Actual Costs:  $15.34M
Full-time equivalent staff:  107
Auxiliary staff: 7
Number of staff with accounting designations: 52
Number of staff with graduate degrees:	28
Other professional accreditations: 46
Financial audit reports completed: 43
Other reports and publications: 17

Training Office

The OAGBC is a recognized Chartered Accountant Training Office, meeting the profession's Practical Experience Requirements of providing audit, assurance and taxation hours.

The OAGBC also participates in the Canadian Comprehensive Auditing Foundation's international programs, which provides performance audit training for developing audit offices in a variety of countries.

Work Performed

Financial Audit
The Auditor General is mandated to "report each year, in accordance with generally accepted auditing and assurance standards, to the Legislative Assembly on the financial statements of the government reporting entity (GRE)." The GRE includes government ministries, Crown corporations, trusts, colleges, school districts, universities, health authorities and other public entities. The audited Summary Financial Statements in 2013/2014 represented $44 billion in expenses, $44 billion  in revenue and $82 billion in assets.

The Auditor General is not required to audit each of these organizations individually, but must develop a Financial Statement Audit Coverage Plan detailing the Office's level of involvement in the audit.

Performance Audit
Under Section 11(8) of the Auditor General Act, the Auditor General is also mandated to report on anything else that they consider should be brought to the attention of the Legislative Assembly. This empowers the Auditor General to conduct performance audits, which look at the management of programs, services and resources. These audits are conducted using a different process than financial audits.

Governance & Accountability
The OAGBC's third stated focus is auditing governance and accountability issues within three main areas: public sector governance, performance reporting and assurance on performance reporting. Reports on these issues can be found in their own section of the OAGBC's website.

References

External links
 Office of the Auditor General of B.C.
 Institute of Chartered Accountants of B.C.
 Canadian Institute of Chartered Accountants
 Canadian Council of Legislative Auditors
 Canadian Comprehensive Auditing Foundation

British Columbia government departments and agencies
British Columbia